Alpaslan Eradlı (born 1948 in İstanbul) is former Turkish footballer. Between 1973 and 1983, he played for Fenerbahçe, and was the captain of the team (1980–1983). He played 414 matches for Fenerbahçe SK and scored 38 goals.

He started his career in amateur level with İstanbul based club Cerrahpaşa Spor Kulubü and then started in professional with İstanbulspor then transferred to Fenerbahçe. He also played 26 times for Turkey and 4 times for Turkey U21.

He was one of the best sweepers in Turkish football history. He ended his career in 1983.

Honours
Turkish Football League (4): 1973-74, 1974-75, 1977-78, 1982-83
Turkish Cup (3): 1973-74, 1978–79, 1982–83
Presidents Cup (2): 1973, 1975
Chancellor Cup (1): 1979-80
TSYD Cup (7): 1973–74, 1975–76, 1976–77, 1978–79, 1979–80, 1980–81, 1982–83
Fleet Cup (2): 1982, 1983

External links
Profile on fenerbahcecumhuriyeti.org

References

1948 births
Living people
Turkish footballers
Fenerbahçe S.K. footballers
İstanbulspor footballers
Turkey international footballers
Association football defenders